Aleksandar Karakašević (born 9 December 1975) is a Serbian table tennis player. His powerful backhand has helped him win against some of the top players in the world. He won a bronze medal at the 2011 European Championship. One of his greatest results achieved in USA is his victory at the US Open Championship in July 2007, where he established himself as a world class athlete, winning the tournament title  for the 3rd time by defeating Kurashima Yosuke from Japan with the result of 4:0.
In 2020 at the age of 45 he is still playing in German Bundesliga (first German division) representing TTC ZUGBRÜCKE GRENZAU.

Karakašević competed at the 1996, 2004, 2008, 2012, and 2016 Summer Olympics.

On 20 November 2021 it was announced that Karakašević had joined the Serbian Progressive Party.

His father, Milivoj Karakašević was a Yugoslav table tennis player.

Career Highlights and Accomplishments
 Bronze medal at European Championship – Singles
 European Champion – Mixed Doubles (four times)
 US Open Champion – Singles (three times)
 US Open Champion – Doubles
 Second place in Europe – Mixed Doubles
 Third place in Pro-Tour final – Men's Doubles- (twice)
 German Open Champion – Men's Doubles
 Brazilian Open Champion – Doubles
 Brazilian Open Champion – Teams
 Mediterranean games Champion – Men's Doubles
 Second place in Mediterranean games – Doubles (twice)
 Second place – Netherlands Open – Men's Doubles
 Third place – Qatar Open – Men's Doubles (twice)
 Balkan Champion (six times)
 Second finisher in European Trials for the Olympic games
 Third place in Junior Europeans (four times)
 Yugoslavian Champion – Singles (three times)
 Yugoslavian Champion – Men's Doubles (five times)
 Yugoslavian Champion – Mixed Doubles (five times)
 Yugoslavian Champion – Teams (four times)

Clubs
 TTF Liebherr Ochsenhausen
 STK Partizan
 STK Unirea Uzdin
 SV Plüderhausen
 STK Crvena Zvezda
 UCAM Cartagena TM

References

External links
 
 
 
 
 
 
 

1975 births
Living people
People from Zemun
Sportspeople from Belgrade
Serbian male table tennis players
Olympic table tennis players of Serbia
Olympic table tennis players of Serbia and Montenegro
Table tennis players at the 1996 Summer Olympics
Table tennis players at the 2004 Summer Olympics
Table tennis players at the 2008 Summer Olympics
Table tennis players at the 2012 Summer Olympics
Table tennis players at the 2016 Summer Olympics
European Games competitors for Serbia
Table tennis players at the 2015 European Games
European champions for Serbia
Mediterranean Games gold medalists for Yugoslavia
Mediterranean Games silver medalists for Yugoslavia
Competitors at the 1997 Mediterranean Games
Competitors at the 2001 Mediterranean Games
Competitors at the 2005 Mediterranean Games
Competitors at the 2009 Mediterranean Games
Mediterranean Games gold medalists for Serbia
Mediterranean Games bronze medalists for Serbia
Mediterranean Games medalists in table tennis
Table tennis players at the 2019 European Games